The Chaim Pinto Synagogue (in Arabic : كنيس حاييم بينتو), an historic site in Essaouira, Morocco, formerly known as Mogador, Morocco, was the home and synagogue of Rabbi Chaim Pinto. Although there is no longer a Jewish community in Essaouira, the building is an active synagogue, used when pilgrims or Jewish tour groups visit the city. The synagogue is on the second floor of a three-story, courtyard building inside the walls of the old city that also contained Rabbi Pinto's home and office. The building is of whitewashed plaster over masonry. The synagogue consists of a single large room. There are two women's sections, one across the courtyard and one on the third floor, both with windows looking into the synagogue. The synagogue room underwent a modern renovation, concealing the ceiling and column capitals, and painting the wood of the Torah ark and bimah light blue.

See also
Moroccan Jews
Hiloula of Rabbi Haim Pinto

References

Synagogues in Morocco
Essaouira